Pornsanae Sitmonchai is a Thai Muay Thai fighter. He is known for his low kicks and aggressive fighting style.

Biography
Pornsanae began training at his home at age 11 and started fighting shortly after. At age 13 he began training at the Sitmonchai gym. He gained popularity in the early 2000s at both Lumpinee Stadium and Rajadamnern Stadium because of his walk forward fighting style. Some of his most famous fights are against Sam-A Kaiyanghadaogym. Despite losing 4 straight to Sam-A, Pornsaneh got a 5th chance to beat him and he did so by winning a split decision. After losing a decision to Kongsak Sitboonmee in December 2010 Pornsaneh took a break from fighting and spent time at a Buddhist temple and at his farm. In August 2011 he returned to the ring and was KO'd by Palangtip Nor Sripuang. In May 2012 he fought for the first time outside of Thailand when he traveled to the Netherlands to face Ilias El Hajoui. On October 13 he once again left Thailand this time to fight in Australia with Michael Thompson. The fight was a modified Thai rules fight with 4 ounce gloves and was contested in an MMA cage.

He fought Yosuke Morii to a split draw on the scorecards of 49-48, 48-49 and 48-48 at RISE/M-1 ~Infinity.II~ in Tokyo, Japan on January 6, 2013.

He TKO'd Yokwitaya Petsimean in two on February 7, 2013.

He beat Kwankao Chor. Rajapatsadu-Esarn by decision in a rematch on February 22, 2013.

In one of the most entertaining fights of the year, Pornsaneh knocked out Saksuriya Gaiyanghadao with a second round high kick at Lumpinee on May 17, 2013.

Pornsaneh lost to Yetkin Ozkul by unanimous decision after a five-round war at Best of Siam 4 in Paris, France, on June 20, 2013.

He best Rungravee Sasiprapa at Siam Warriors in Cork, Ireland, on October 12, 2013 with a KO by way of elbow.

He lost to Genji Umeno by fourth-round TKO due to a cut caused by an elbow at Rikix: No Kick, No Life 2014 in Tokyo, Japan on February 11, 2014.

Pornsanae rematched Yetkin Özkul in a fight for the WBC Muaythai World Lightweight (-61.2 kg/135 lb) Championship at Le Choc des Légendes 2014 in Saint-Ouen, Seine-Saint-Denis, France on March 8, 2014, losing by third-round TKO. There was considerable controversy surrounding the match as the Sitmonchai camp claimed post-fight that Pornsanae had only been informed of the title on the line in the days leading up to the fight and that Özkul had been prevented from making the contracted weight due to stomach problems and instead weighed in around 72 kg/160 lb, although no official weigh-ins took place. Sitmonchai reluctantly accepted the fight due to their dependency on the promoter to pay them and get them back to Thailand.

Murder charge
Pornsanae Sitmonchai (legal name Noppasit Chinjaiyen) on the night of July 30, 2020 was involved in the murder of Sawang Charoenmak a 43 year old man from Kanchanaburi known by locals for raising cock-fighting chickens. He is suspected of killing the man as the man's wife had used Pornsanae's wife's phone number when ordering a package online. There is believed to have been no direct issues between the two despite this small but deadly incident. On the 2nd of August Pornsanae handed himself into police custody, after 3 days in hiding.

Titles and accomplishments
Muaythai
 Delo Cup champion 110 pounds 
 Toyota tournament champion 118 pounds
 Rajadamnern Stadium champion 115 pound
 Champion of Thailand 126 pounds
 WMC champion 130 pounds
Thai National Champion 130 pounds
Omnoi Stadium 130 lbs. Champion
Awards
2010 Lumpinee Stadium Fight of the Year (vs Pakorn Sakyothin)
 2009 Siam Kela Fighter of the Year

Muay Thai record

|-  style="background:#fbc;"
| 2017-12-10 || Loss ||align=left| Yosuke Mizuochi || KING OF KNOCK OUT 2017 || Tokyo, Japan || KO (punch) || 4 || 1:28
|-
|-  bgcolor="#FFBBBB"
|-  style="background:#cfc;"
| 2014-04-18 ||Win ||align=left| Phet J.L.Suit || Omnoi Stadium || Bangkok, Thailand || KO || 2 || 
|-  style="background:#fbc;"
! style=background:white colspan=9 |
|-  style="background:#fbc;"
| 2014-12-20 || Loss ||align=left| Denis Puric || Top King World Series 2014 || Hong Kong || KO || 1 || 
|-
|-  style="background:#fbc;"
| 2014-11-30 || Loss ||align=left| Hiroaki Suzuki || S-Cup 65 kg tournament || Tokyo, Japan || KO || 3 || 
|-
|-  style="background:#cfc;"
| 2014-11-09 ||Win ||align=left| ET Por Tor Tongtavi || Lumpinee Stadium || Bangkok, Thailand || Decision || 5 || 
|-  style="background:#cfc;"
| 2014-10-10 ||Win ||align=left| Sangtongnoi Tanasukarn || Lumpinee Stadium || Bangkok, Thailand || KO || 3 || 
|-  style="background:#fbc;"
| 2014-09-10 ||Loss ||align=left| Superlek Kiatmuu9 || Rajadamnern Stadium || Bangkok, Thailand || KO (head kick) || 1 || 2:59
|-
|-  style="background:#fbc;"
| 2014-08-16 || Loss || align=left| Rungravee Sasiprapa || Sandee & Siam Warriors Muay Thai Super Fights || Dublin, Ireland || Decision  || 5 || 3:00
|-
|-  style="background:#fbc;"
| 2014-07-08 ||Loss ||align=left| Pokaew Fonjangchonburi || Lumpinee Stadium || Bangkok, Thailand || TKO (punches) || 2 || 
|-  bgcolor="#FFBBBB"
|-  style="background:#cfc;"
| 2014-04-19 ||Win ||align=left| Manaowan Sitsongpeenong|| Omnoi Stadium || Bangkok, Thailand || KO || 2 || 
|-  style="background:#fbc;"
! style=background:white colspan=9 |
|-
|-  style="background:#fbc;"
| 2014-03-08 || Loss ||align=left| Yetkin Özkul || Le Choc des Légendes 2014 || Saint-Ouen, France || TKO (punches) || 3 || 0:52
|-
! style=background:white colspan=9 |
|-
|-  style="background:#fbc;"
| 2014-02-11 || Loss ||align=left| Genji Umeno || Rikix: No Kick, No Life 2014 || Tokyo, Japan || TKO (cut) || 4 || 0:48
|-
|-  style="background:#fbc;"
| 2014-01-03 ||Loss ||align=left| Kwankhao Mor.Ratanabandit || Lumpinee Stadium || Bangkok, Thailand || KO (elbow)|| 3 || 
|-  style="background:#cfc;"
| 2013-12-21 ||Win ||align=left| Lekglaa Thanasuratnakorn || 11th Military Academy || Bangkok, Thailand || KO (high kick) || 1 || 
|-  style="background:#cfc;"
| 2013-11-12 ||Win ||align=left| Tingtong Chor Kor.Yuha-Isuzu || Lumpinee Stadium || Bangkok, Thailand || Decision || 5 || 
|-  style="background:#cfc;"
| 2013-10-12 ||Win ||align=left| Rungravee Sasiprapa || Siam Warriors || Cork, Ireland || KO (Right Elbow) || 3 || 
|-  style="background:#fbc;"
| 2013-09-03 ||Loss ||align=left| Kwankhao Mor.Ratanabandit || Lumpinee Stadium || Bangkok, Thailand || TKO (cuts)|| 4 || 
|-  style="background:#fbc;"
| 2013-06-20 ||Loss ||align=left| Yetkin Ozkul || Best of Siam 4 || Paris, France || Decision (unanimous) || 5 || 3:00
|-  style="background:#cfc;"
| 2013-05-17 ||Win ||align=left| Saksuriya Kaiyanghadaw || Lumpinee Stadium || Bangkok, Thailand || KO (high kick) || 2 || 
|-  style="background:#fbc;"
| 2013-04-09 ||Loss ||align=left| Palangtip Nor.Sripueng || Lumpinee Stadium || Bangkok, Thailand || Decision || 5 || 3:00
|-  style="background:#cfc;"
| 2013-02-22 || Win ||align=left| Kwankhao Mor.Ratanabandit || Rajadamnern Stadium || Bangkok, Thailand || Decision || 5 || 3:00
|-  style="background:#cfc;"
| 2013-02-07 || Win ||align=left| Yokwitaya Petsimean || Rajadamnern Stadium || Bangkok, Thailand || TKO || 2 || 
|-  style="background:#c5d2ea;"
| 2013-01-06 || Draw ||align=left| Yosuke Morii || RISE/M-1 ~Infinity.II~ || Tokyo, Japan || Decision (split) || 5 || 3:00
|-  style="background:#cfc;"
| 2012-11-03 ||Win ||align=left| Kwankhao Mor.Ratanabandit || || Thailand || TKO || 3 ||
|-  style="background:#fbc;"
| 2012-10-13 ||Loss ||align=left| Michael Thompson || Caged Muay Thai || Australia || Decision || 3 || 3:00
|-  style="background:#cfc;"
| 2012-09-15 ||Win ||align=left| Kongnapa Sirimongkol || || Thailand || TKO || 3 ||
|-  style="background:#fbc;"
| 2012--||Loss ||align=left| Rodlek Jaotalaytong || || Thailand || KO (head kick)  ||  ||  
|-  style="background:#fbc;"
| 2012-07-06 ||Loss ||align=left| Palangtip Nor Sripuang || Lumpinee Stadium || Bangkok, Thailand || Decision || 5 || 3:00
|-  style="background:#cfc;"
| 2012-05-27 ||Win ||align=left| Ilias El Hajoui || SLAMM || Netherlands || Decision || 5 || 3:00
|-  style="background:#fbc;"
| 2012-03-02 ||Loss ||align=left| Tingtong Chor Koiyuhaisuzu || Lumpinee Stadium || Bangkok, Thailand || Decision || 5 || 3:00
|-  style="background:#fbc;"
| 2012-01-10 ||Loss ||align=left| Palangtip Nor Sripuang || Lumpinee Stadium || Bangkok, Thailand || KO (elbow) || 4 || 
|-  style="background:#fbc;"
| 2011-12-09 ||Loss ||align=left| Thong Puideenaidee || Lumpinee Stadium || Bangkok, Thailand || Decision || 5 || 3:00 
|-  style="background:#cfc;"
| 2011-10-07 ||Win ||align=left| Yuttachai Kiatpataraan|| Lumpini Stadium || Bangkok, Thailand || TKO || 1 ||  
|-  style="background:#fbc;"
| 2011-08-23 ||Loss ||align=left| Palangtip Nor Sripuang || Lumpinee Stadium || Bangkok, Thailand || KO (elbow) || 3 ||
|-  style="background:#fbc;"
| 2010-12-07 ||Loss ||align=left| Kongsak Sitboonmee || Lumpinee Stadium || Bangkok, Thailand || Decision || 5 || 3:00 
|-  style="background:#fbc;"
| 2010-11-02 ||Loss ||align=left| Noppakrit Kor Kampanart || Lumpinee Stadium || Bangkok, Thailand || Decision || 5 || 3:00 
|-  style="background:#fbc;"
| 2010-10-05 ||Loss ||align=left| Singtongnoi Por.Telakun || Lumpinee Stadium || Bangkok, Thailand || Decision || 5 || 3:00 
|-  style="background:#fbc;"
| 2010-08-10 ||Loss ||align=left| Nong-O Kaiyanghadaogym || Lumpinee Stadium || Bangkok, Thailand || Decision || 5 || 3:00 
|-  style="background:#cfc;"
| 2010-07-13 ||Win ||align=left| Dokmaipa Wor Sangprapai || Lumpinee Stadium || Bangkok, Thailand || TKO || 3 || 
|-  style="background:#fbc;"
| 2010-06-10 ||Loss ||align=left| Pakorn PKSaenchaimuaythaigym || Rajadamnern Stadium || Bangkok, Thailand || Decision || 5 || 3:00 
|-  style="background:#fbc;"
| 2010-03-05 ||Loss ||align=left| Pakorn PKSaenchaimuaythaigym || Lumpinee Stadium || Bangkok, Thailand || Decision || 5 || 3:00 
|-  style="background:#cfc;"
| 2010-02-10 ||Win ||align=left| Sam-A Kaiyanghadaogym || Rajadamnern Stadium || Bangkok, Thailand || Decision || 5 || 3:00
|-  style="background:#cfc;"
| 2009-12-29 ||Win ||align=left| F-16 Rachanon || Lumpinee Stadium || Bangkok, Thailand || TKO || 3 || 
|-  style="background:#cfc;"
| 2009-12-08 ||Win ||align=left| Traijak Sitjomtrai || Lumpinee Stadium || Bangkok, Thailand || TKO || 3 || 
|-  style="background:#cfc;"
| 2009-10-30 ||Win ||align=left| Yodchat Fairtex || Lumpinee Stadium || Bangkok, Thailand || TKO || 3 || 
|-  style="background:#fbc;"
| 2009-09-25 ||Loss ||align=left| Sam-A Kaiyanghadaogym || Lumpinee Stadium || Bangkok, Thailand || Decision || 5 || 3:00   
|-  style="background:#fbc;"
| 2009-08-06 ||Loss ||align=left| Manasak Sitniwat || Rajadamnern Stadium || Bangkok, Thailand || Decision || 5 || 3:00 
|-  style="background:#cfc;"
| 2009-07-03 ||Win ||align=left| Wuttidet Lukprabat || Lumpinee Stadium || Bangkok, Thailand || TKO || 2 || 
|-  style="background:#fbc;"
| 2009-05-26 ||Loss ||align=left| Sam-A Kaiyanghadaogym || Lumpinee Stadium || Bangkok, Thailand || Decision || 5 || 3:00 
|-  style="background:#cfc;"
| 2009-04-03 ||Win ||align=left| Rungruanglek Lukprabat || Lumpinee Stadium || Bangkok, Thailand || TKO || 2 || 
|-  style="background:#fbc;"
| 2009-02-06 ||Loss ||align=left| Sam-A Kaiyanghadaogym || Lumpinee Stadium || Bangkok, Thailand || Decision || 5 || 3:00 
|-  style="background:#fbc;"
| 2009-01-06 ||Loss ||align=left| Sam-A Kaiyanghadaogym || Lumpinee Stadium || Bangkok, Thailand || Decision || 5 || 3:00
|-  style="background:#cfc;"
| 2008-12-09 ||Win ||align=left| Janrob Sakhomsin || Lumpinee Stadium || Bangkok, Thailand || TKO || 1 || 
|-  style="background:#cfc;"
| 2008-10-08 ||Win ||align=left| Detsuriya Sitthiprassert|| Rajadamnern Stadium || Bangkok, Thailand || TKO || 2 || 
|-  style="background:#cfc;"
| 2008-09-10 ||Win ||align=left| Pandin Sor Damrongrit || Rajadamnern Stadium || Bangkok, Thailand || TKO || 2 || 
|-  style="background:#cfc;"
| 2008-08-20 ||Win ||align=left| Payannoi Sor Aranya || Rajadamnern Stadium || Bangkok, Thailand || TKO || 1 ||  
|-  style="background:#fbc;"
| 2008-06-09 ||Loss ||align=left| Thong Puideenaidee || Rajadamnern Stadium || Bangkok, Thailand || Decision || 5 || 3:00 
|-  style="background:#fbc;"
| 2008-04-10 ||Loss ||align=left| Khaimmukdam Ekbangsai || Rajadamnern Stadium || Bangkok, Thailand || TKO || 3 ||  
|-  style="background:#fbc;"
| 2008-01-30 ||Loss ||align=left| Rittijak Kaewsamrit || Rajadamnern Stadium || Bangkok, Thailand || Decision || 5 || 3:00 
|-  style="background:#fbc;"
| 2007-05-07 ||Loss ||align=left| Ponmongkon Sakhiran|| Rajadamnern Stadium || Bangkok, Thailand || Decision || 5 || 3:00 
|-  style="background:#cfc;"
| 2007-03-08 ||Win ||align=left| Chatchainoi Gardinsview || Rajadamnern Stadium || Bangkok, Thailand || TKO || 4 || 
|-  style="background:#c5d2ea;"
| 2006-09-06 ||Draw ||align=left| Sonnarai Tawan || Rajadamnern Stadium || Bangkok, Thailand || Decision || 5 || 3:00 
|-  style="background:#fbb;"
| 2006-08-29 ||Loss||align=left| Pinsiam Sor.Amnuaysirichoke || Lumpinee Stadium || Bangkok, Thailand || Decision || 5 || 3:00 
|-  style="background:#fbc;"
| 2006-05-04 ||Loss ||align=left| Kanachai Kor Bankui || Rajadamnern Stadium || Bangkok, Thailand || TKO || 4 ||  
|-  style="background:#cfc;"
| 2006-04-04 ||Win ||align=left| Dendanai Kiatsakongka || Lumpinee Stadium || Bangkok, Thailand || Decision || 5 || 3:00 
|-  style="background:#cfc;"
| 2006-03-03 ||Win ||align=left| Erawan Narupai || Lumpinee Stadium || Bangkok, Thailand || Decision || 5 || 3:00 
|-  style="background:#fbc;"
| 2005-12-21 ||Loss ||align=left| Rattansak Wor Valapon || Rajadamnern Stadium || Bangkok, Thailand || TKO || 2 || 
|-  style="background:#cfc;"
| 2005-09-15 ||Win ||align=left| Thongchai Tor. Silachai || Rajadamnern Stadium || Bangkok, Thailand || Decision || 5 || 3:00 
|-  style="background:#cfc;"
| 2005-08-08 ||Win ||align=left| Sayannoi Kiatprapat || Rajadamnern Stadium || Bangkok, Thailand || Decision || 5 || 3:00 
|-  style="background:#cfc;"
| 2005-07-06 ||Win ||align=left| Chatchainoi Sitbenjama || Rajadamnern Stadium || Bangkok, Thailand || Decision || 5 || 3:00 
|-  style="background:#cfc;"
| 2005-05-16 ||Win ||align=left| Tubnar Sitromzai || Rajadamnern Stadium || Bangkok, Thailand || TKO|| 1 || 
|-  style="background:#cfc;"
| 2005-02-14 ||Win ||align=left| Wannar Kaennorsing || Rajadamnern Stadium || Bangkok, Thailand || Decision || 5 || 3:00 
|-  style="background:#cfc;"
| 2005-01-05 ||Win ||align=left| Kwanpichit 13 REin Express || Rajadamnern Stadium || Bangkok, Thailand || TKO || 1 || 
|-  style="background:#fbc;"
| 2005-- ||Loss ||align=left| Narunart Chengsimaewgym || || Bangkok, Thailand || TKO || 3 || 3:00 
|-  style="background:#cfc;"
| 2004-12-06 ||Win ||align=left| Phayser Sor Hengjaren || Rajadamnern Stadium || Bangkok, Thailand || TKO || 3 || 
|-  style="background:#fbc;"
| 2004-11-11 ||Loss ||align=left| Thongchai Tor. Silachai || Rajadamnern Stadium || Bangkok, Thailand || Decision || 5 || 3:00 
|-  style="background:#cfc;"
| 2004-10-04 ||Win ||align=left| Rungruanglek Lukprabat || Rajadamnern Stadium || Bangkok, Thailand || Decision || 5 || 3:00 
|-  style="background:#fbc;"
| 2004-07-30 ||Loss ||align=left| Pongsing Sitbenjama|| Lumpinee Stadium || Bangkok, Thailand || Decision || 5 || 3:00 
|-  style="background:#cfc;"
| 2004-06-03 ||Win ||align=left| Chatchainoi Sitbenjama || Rajadamnern Stadium || Bangkok, Thailand || KO || 3 ||  
|-  style="background:#fbc;"
| 2004-04-08 ||Loss ||align=left| Kwanpichit H Pattanachai || Rajadamnern Stadium || Bangkok, Thailand || Decision || 5 || 3:00 
|-  style="background:#fbc;"
| 2004-02-16 ||Loss ||align=left| Saenchainoi Seandeatgym || Rajadamnern Stadium || Bangkok, Thailand || Decision || 5 || 3:00 
|-  style="background:#cfc;"
| 2003-12-21 ||Win ||align=left| Seanchainoi Seandeatgym || Rajadamnern Stadium || Bangkok, Thailand || Decision || 5 || 3:00
|-  style="background:#cfc;"
| 2003-11-02 ||Win ||align=left| Orono Muangsima || Rajadamnern Stadium || Bangkok, Thailand || KO || 2 ||  
|-  style="background:#fbc;"
| 2003-08-29 ||Loss ||align=left| Pinsiam Sor.Amnuaysirichoke || Lumpinee Stadium || Bangkok, Thailand || Decision || 5 || 3:00 
|-  style="background:#fbc;"
| 2003-07-04 ||Loss ||align=left| Pinsiam Sor.Amnuaysirichoke || Lumpinee Stadium || Bangkok, Thailand || Decision || 5 || 3:00 
|-  style="background:#cfc;"
| 2003-02-18 || Win ||align=left| Yodsanklai Fairtex || SUK Fairtex, Lumpinee Stadium || Bangkok, Thailand || TKO || 4 ||
|-  style="background:#cfc;"
| 2003-01-14 || Win ||align=left| Yodsanklai Fairtex || SUK Petpanomurung, Lumpinee Stadium || Bangkok, Thailand || KO || 3 || 
|-  style="background:#cfc;"
| 2001-11-07 || Win||align=left| Bovy Sor Udomson || Rajadamnern Stadium || Thailand || Decision || 5 || 3:00 
|-  style="background:#fbb;"
| 2001- || Loss ||align=left| Thongchai Tor. Silachai ||  || Thailand || Decision || 5 || 3:00
|-  style="background:#;"
| 2001-08-29|| ||align=left| Puja Sor.Suwanee || Rajadamnern Stadium || Thailand || ||  || 
|-  style="background:#;"
| 2001-07-09|| ||align=left| Phetmanee Phetsuphapan || Rajadamnern Stadium || Thailand || ||  || 
|-  style="background:#cfc;"
| 2001-02-22 || Win||align=left| Thod Tai Lek NakornthongParkView || Rajadamnern Stadium || Thailand || Decision || 5 || 3:00 
|-
| colspan=9 | Legend:

References

1981 births
Living people
Featherweight kickboxers
Pornsanae Sitmonchai
Pornsanae Sitmonchai